L. James Rice (Lee James Rice, b. 29 July 1968) is the award-winning author of the fantasy novel series Sundering the Gods Saga.

Rice studied English at the University of Northern Iowa and screenwriting at UCLA before turning his attention to writing novels. Rice is an Active Member of the Science Fiction and Fantasy Writers of America.

Rice's first book, Eve of Snows, was published June 25, 2018. Eve of Snows earned an Editor's Pick Review at Booklife by Publishers Weekly, and a 5-Star Review from Indiereader.com  In December 2019, Eve of Snows won the Epic Fantasy Fanatics Readers Choice Award, and early in 2020 the book won the Next Generation Indie Book Awards in the Fantasy Category while also taking the Second Place Grand Prize in all of Fiction. It also took Third Place in the Independent Publisher Book Awards for Fantasy

The Sundering the Gods series is a tale told from the experiences of multiple characters in a close 3rd Omniscient Point of View.  The Sundering the Gods Saga is set in a secondary world known as The Sister Continents.  The series concluded on June 25, 2020, with the release of Whispers of Ghosts.

L. James Rice resides with his wife and two daughters in southwest Iowa.

Novels 
Sundering the Gods Saga

 Eve of Snows
 Meliu
 Trail of Pyres
 Solineus
 Whispers of Ghosts

Standalone Novels

 The Contessa of Mostul Ûbar (Upcoming)

Sundering the Crowns Saga

 Dark Cloud Dancing (Upcoming)

Awards 

 2019 Epic Fantasy Fanatics Readers Choice Award
 Winner 2020 Next Generation Indie Book Awards for Fantasy
 Grand Prize 2020 Next Generation Indie Book Awards for Fiction
 Bronze Medal 2020 Independent Publisher Book Awards for Fantasy

References

1968 births
Living people
UCLA Film School alumni